Andrew Fitzhenry (born 14 March 1968) is an Australian former professional rugby league footballer who played for the Penrith Panthers and Parramatta Eels in the New South Wales Rugby League (NSWRL).

As a youth, Fitzhenry represented NSW Under 19s in both cricket and rugby league.

Fitzhenry started his NSWRL career at Penrith, where he played as a halfback and featured in four premiership games in 1987. From 1988 to 1992 he played for Parramatta, during which time he amassed a further 35 appearances in first-grade, as a goal-kicking fullback.

In addition to rugby league, Fitzhenry also played first-grade cricket, as a wicket-keeper batsman for Balmain.

References

External links

Andrew Fitzhenry at Rugby League project

1968 births
Living people
Australian cricketers
Australian rugby league players
Penrith Panthers players
Parramatta Eels players
Rugby league halfbacks
Rugby league fullbacks